At the 1964 Summer Olympics, 16 wrestling events were contested, for all men. There were eight weight classes in Greco-Roman wrestling and eight classes in freestyle wrestling.

Medal table

Medal summary

Greco-Roman

Freestyle

Participating nations
A total of 275 wrestlers from 42 nations competed at the Tokyo Games:

See also
List of World and Olympic Champions in men's freestyle wrestling
List of World and Olympic Champions in Greco-Roman wrestling

References

 
1964 Summer Olympics events
1964